Craig Sherborne (born 1962) is an Australian poet, playwright and novelist.  He was born in Sydney and attended Scots College there before studying drama in London. He lives in Melbourne.

Awards 

 The Ones Out of Town,  1989 winner Wal Cherry Play of the Year Award for Best Unproduced Play 
 Hoi Polloi 2006 shortlisted Victorian Premier's Literary Awards — The Nettie Palmer Prize for Non-Fiction
 Hoi Polloi 2007 highly commended National Biography Award
 Muck 2008 shortlisted Victorian Premier's Literary Awards — The Nettie Palmer Prize for Non-Fiction 
 Muck 2008 winner Queensland Premier's Literary Awards — Best Non-Fiction Book 
 The Amateur Science of Love 2011 shortlisted Victorian Premier's Literary Awards — The Vance Palmer Prize for Fiction
 The Amateur Science of Love 2012 winner Melbourne Prize — Best Writing Award 
 The Amateur Science of Love 2012 shortlisted New South Wales Premier's Literary Awards — UTS Award for New Writing 
 Tree Palace 2015 shortlisted Miles Franklin Literary Award

Bibliography

Novels
 The Amateur Science of Love (2011)
 Tree Palace (2014)
 Off the Record: A novel (2018)
 The Grass Hotel (2022)

Poetry
Collections
 Necessary Evil (2006)
List of poems

Drama
 The Ones Out of Town (1989)
 Look at Everything Twice, For Me (1999)
 Off the Record (2004)

Autobiography
 Hoi Polloi (2005)
 Muck (2007)

References

1962 births
Living people
21st-century Australian novelists
Australian poets
Australian dramatists and playwrights
Quadrant (magazine) people